Synolos is a Social Enterprise (CIC) organisation based in West Oxfordshire, founded by Barry Ingleton in 2010 which helps individuals to improve their lives and build the future that they aspire to. Synolos does this by offering practical classes that builds educational attainment, work based skill underpinned but we well being awareness.

References

2010 establishments in the United Kingdom